The Bell Witch Haunting is a 2013 horror film based on the story of the Bell Witch that haunts a modern American family. The film was preceded by others based on the same plot, Bell Witch Haunting (2004), An American Haunting (2005) and Bell Witch: The Movie (2007).

Plot
In Tennessee, the Robertson County Sheriff’s Department releases a footage found on the cell phones and video cameras of the dead Sawyer family. What was first thought to be a murder-suicide is now believed to be the return of a centuries-old supernatural sinister force.

Reception
Rob Getz from Horrornews.net noted that "though utilizing the oddly tropical January climate in Tennessee... for a few pivotal witchy woodland shenanigans, much of the film takes place within the walls of the Sawyer home, owing a greater debt to the “Paranormal Activity” franchise". Getz added that the film is "slapping elements of "The Exorcist", "Darkness Falls" and countless others into the wildly uneven casserole" and that "watching this Amtrak jump the rails is never short of interesting".

References

External links

Films about witchcraft
2013 horror films
2013 films
Found footage films
American supernatural horror films
The Asylum films
2010s English-language films
2010s American films